The Pitlochry Festival Theatre is large performing arts theatre located in the town and burgh of Pitlochry in Perth and Kinross, Scotland. The idea of a performance space in the area was conceived in the late 1940s by John Stewart, a leading promoter of amateur dramatics in Glasgow. The theatre officially opened on 19 May 1951.

History
After the decline and subsequent closure of  his Park Theatre Club in the West End of Glasgow, John Stewart decided to plan a theatre site in the Knockendarroch area of Pitlochry. However Stewart's plans were met with little success as building licences were refused by the Ministry of Works.

Following this setback, Stewart had the idea of founding a tent-style theatre. After viewing the wet weather tent of London's Regent's Park and the Birmingham Arena Theatre, Stewart searched for the tents' construction company in Walsall, eventually investing in one for a theatre space for Pitlochry.

After construction work and promotion by the Scottish Tourist Board, the theatre officially opened on 19 May 1951. In his opening address, the chairman of the board and later Secretary of State for Scotland Tom Johnston said, "This theatre is a monument to one man’s courage, one man’s persistence, and one man’s great faith."

After 30 years of use and regular incidents of weather damage to the tents, it was decided in the late 1970s that the tent structure would be renovated and stabilised. Construction work began on a new theatre building at the current site, and eventually on 19 May 1981 the new theatre building was opened on the 30th anniversary of John Stewart's first tent.

Modern day
The theatre is now of great cultural importance to the Perthshire area. Every summer, the theatre and its surrounding area attract thousands of tourists with the theatre's famous summer season, which showcases a large amount of the country's talent in dramatic arts, comedy and writing.

Each summer the theatre offers six plays in daily repertory, enabling visitors to see six plays in six nights (or in four days if two matinees are included); the theatre asserts that "No other UK theatre attempts this extraordinary feat" and that the nearest similar offering is in Canada. For example, the 2018 season offered: Chicago the musical; Jim Cartwright's The Rise and Fall of Little Voice; J. M. Barrie's Quality Street; Tom Stoppard's Travesties; Rodney Ackland's Before the Party; and Rona Munro's The Last Witch.

Expansion
In 2014, it was announced that the Pitlochry Festival Theatre would undergo a £25 million expansion of the current building. Plans were made to have the expansion completed and opened for the theatre's 70th anniversary in 2021.

References

External links

Theatres completed in 1951
Theatres completed in 1981
Theatres in Scotland
Performance art venues
1951 establishments in Scotland
Buildings and structures in Pitlochry